The Col Pearce Medal is awarded each year (annually) to the referee judged as being the best referee over the entire National Rugby League (NRL) season in Australia.

History 
The award is named after Col Pearce, who was a rugby league referee that referee'd from 1946 until 1968. He referee'd in 343 top grade matches, including 6 Grand Finals. He also referee'd in 9 Test Matches, including 3 World Cup matches. He also helped coach the referee's for much of his later life. Tony Archer has referred to him as the doyen of Referee's.

The idea of a medal for best referee was created by Robert Finch, as he thought there was little recognition given to the best referee in any season.

Winners

Multiple Winners

See also

Dally M Medal
Harry Sunderland Trophy
Norm Smith Medal

References

External links

Rugby league trophies and awards
Australian sports trophies and awards
National Rugby League
National Rugby League referees
Awards established in 2004
2004 establishments in Australia